1999 is the debut studio album by French electronic music duo Cassius, released on 25 January 1999 by Virgin Records.

Background 

The album was written and produced by Cassius members Philippe Zdar and Boombass.

1999 reached number 28 in the UK Albums Chart. As of September 2006 the album has shipped 260,000 units worldwide according to their label.

Reception 

John Bush of AllMusic qualified the album as "A sleek and intelligent dance record", while James P. Wisdom of Pitchfork wrote: "Maybe I need some coke to truly delight in the seething vacancy of 1999, but I'm pretty sure that it's clearly not happening."

Track listings 

Sample credits

 "Feeling for You" contains a sample of "Something" by Al Green in the intro, a sample of "All This Love That I'm Giving" by Gwen McCrae, and a drum sample of "Got to Have It" by The Soul President
 "Crazy Legs" contains a sample of "B-Boys Beware" by Two Sisters
 "La Mouche" contains a sample of "Thousand Finger Man" by Candido
 "Foxxy" contains each sample of "Foxy Brown Theme" and "Chase" by Willie Hutch
 "Planetz" contains a sample of "The Planets of Life" by The Whispers
 "Mister Eveready" contains a sample of "Ghetto Heaven" by The Family Stand
 "Nulife" contains a sample of "Precious Woman" by Dynamic Corvettes
 "Somebody" contains a sample of "DWYCK" by Gang Starr feat. Nice & Smooth
 "Cassius 1999 Remix" contains a sample of "[If It] Hurts Just a Little" by Donna Summer
 "La Mouche" (DJ Falcon Metal Mix) contains samples from "The Rock Is Hot" by Crown Heights Affair and "Just Us" by Two Tons O' Fun

Charts

References 

1999 debut albums
Cassius (band) albums
Virgin Records albums
Album chart usages for UK2